Sillas River is a non-existent river believed by Megasthenes (c. 350 BCE-290 BCE) (a Greek traveller and geographer who visited India during the third century BCE) to be flowing in India. According  to Magasthenes, this river was peculiar since nothing cast into it would float but strangely would sink to the bottom. Magasthenes had mentioned it in his book - Indika. No such river has been ever found in India or elsewhere.

References

Mythological rivers
Rivers of India